Hiestand is a surname. Notable people with the surname include:

Edgar W. Hiestand (1888–1970), American businessman and politician
Emily Hiestand (born 1947), American writer and poet
Harry Hiestand (born 1958), American football coach
John Andrew Hiestand (1824–1890), American politician
Joseph Hiestand (1906–2004), American politician
Samuel Hiestand (1782–1838), American bishop of the Church of the United Brethren in Christ